Leonid Andriyovych Baranovskyi (15 July 1953 – 8 December 2013) was a Ukrainian footballer who primarily played as a midfielder.

Leonid Baranovskyi died following a long illness on 8 December 2013, aged 60, in Odessa, Ukraine.

References

External links
 

1953 births
2013 deaths
Soviet footballers
Ukrainian footballers
FC Chornomorets Odesa players
SKA Odesa players
Footballers from Odesa
Association football midfielders
Odesa National Economics University alumni